Showler is a surname. Notable people with the surname include:

 Paul Showler (born 1966), English footballer and physiotherapist
 Karl Showler (born 1932), director of the International Bee Research Association and author

See also
 Shower (surname)